The Bishop Arts District is a shopping and entertainment district in North Oak Cliff, Dallas, Texas (USA), near the intersection of Bishop Street and Davis Street.  The Bishop Arts District is immediately southwest of Downtown Dallas and south of the Kessler neighborhoods. The Bishop Arts District is home to over 60 independent boutiques, restaurants, bars, coffee shops, and art galleries.

History 
The area was originally developed as warehouses and shops in the 1920s. In the 1930s, a trolley stop along Davis became Dallas' busiest trolley stop. The district began a decline in the mid-1960s through the beginning of the 1980s. 

In the fall of 1984, Jim Lake saw a bargain in the now run down storefronts and began buying up property. He said, "Hopefully we'll make money on this in the future, but in the first three to five years I'm gonna feed it." Lake said of his decision to buy the property, "I just thought it needed saving." As a sign of his commitment, Lake provided, rent-free for a year, space for a police storefront. This was an important element in the area's security and sense of community. 

Continuing through the 1990s and 2000s, renovations have taken place to transform the two city blocks into a walkable, urban environment. Murals, brick pavers, and other street elements have polished the rough look of the warehouses and have made the area a popular leisure and dining destination. In 2015, Exxir Capital invested $42 million to construct a mixed-use development includes retail, office, and apartments in the district.

A portion of the district is listed on the National Register of Historic Places as the North Bishop Avenue Commercial Historic District.

In popular culture
The Bishop Arts District has become a popular destination for celebrities to visit. Past celebrity sightings include Dua Lipa, Lana Del Ray, Leon Bridges, and The Weeknd.

The area's culture has continued to mature with the expanding Oak Cliff Film Festival, which has garnered media attention from Texas Monthly and The New York Times.

Landmarks 

Kessler Theater - an Art Deco theater built in 1942.
Mayor's House - former Dallas mayor George Sergeant's residence.

Transportation
The district can be reached via several Dallas Area Rapid Transit bus routes and from Downtown Dallas on the Dallas Streetcar.

References

External links

Arts in Dallas
Arts districts
Warehouse districts of the United States